The 2011–12 Algerian Cup was the 48th edition of the Algerian Cup. JS Kabylie were the defending champions, having beaten USM El Harrach 1–0 in the previous season's final.

In the final, ES Sétif beat CR Belouizdad 2-1 in extra-time to win its 8th Algerian Cup title.

Round of 64
The round of 64 is the first national round of the Algerian Cup. On December 6, 2011, the draw for the rounds of 64 and 32 were held at a ceremony at the Sheraton Hotel in Algiers.

Round of 32

Round of 16

Matches

Quarter-finals

Semi-finals
The draw for the semi-finals took place on April 8, 2012 live on Algérie 3. The ties are to be played on the weekend of April 20–21. All four teams are from the Algerian Ligue Professionnelle 1. The teams drawn first will host the ties.

Matches

Final

Matches

References

Algerian Cup
Algerian Cup
2011–12 in Algerian football